The 1915–16 team finished with a record of 10–4. It was the 1st year for head coach Elmer D. Mitchell. The team captain was George Mead.

Schedule

|-
!colspan=9 style="background:#006633; color:#FFFFFF;"| Non-conference regular season

1. EMU list score as 41-46 and Adrian list score as 39-46.

References

Eastern Michigan Eagles men's basketball seasons
Michigan State Normal